Below is a list of talk show hosts, sorted alphabetically by their surnames.



A

B

C

D

E

F

G

H

I

J

K

L

M

N

O

P

Q

R

S

T

U

V

W

Y

Z

See also
 List of game show hosts

References

Talk show hosts